The Prix de la page 112 is a French literary award created in 2012 by the French editor and literary critic Claire Debru.

Purpose 
The name and the purpose of this award was inspired by Woody Allen's film Hannah and Her Sisters. In the film, actor Michael Caine tells a woman that she reminds him of a love poem on page 112 of a book of poetry written by e e cummings. If an entire work is to be judged, this principle assumes that page 112 is an index of quality since the beginning and the end of the work are subjected to a greater amount of attention by authors and editors, whereas page 112 is the ventre mou or soft belly. Thus, the jury members first read this page to determine if a book should be read to qualify for the award.

Laureates 
 2012 : La Recherche de la couleur by Jean-Marc Parisis
 2013 : Les Evaporés by Thomas B. Reverdy
 2014 : No award
 2015 : Berezina by Sylvain Tesson
 2016 : Basse Fidélité by Philippe Dumez
 2017 : Sanglier by Dominique Rameau
 2018 : La Dernière France by Jacques Jouet

Notes and References

External links 
 

page 112
Awards established in 2012
2012 establishments in France